Karin A. Wulf (born August 26, 1964) is an American historian and the executive director of the Omohundro Institute of Early American History and Culture at the College of William & Mary in Williamsburg, Virginia. Wulf began her tenure as the Director of the Omohundro Institute on July 1, 2013. She is also one of the founders of Women Also Know History, a searchable website database of women historians. Additionally, Wulf worked to spearhead a neurodiversity working group at William & Mary in 2011. She is currently writing a book about genealogy and political culture in Early America titled, Lineage: Genealogy and the Politics of Connection in British America, 1680-1820. Her work examines the history of women, gender, and the family in Early America.

Wulf joined Brown University as the Beatrice and Julio Mario Santo Domingo Director and Librarian of the John Carter Brown Library in October 2021.

Bibliography
The Diary of Hannah Callender Sansom: Sense and Sensibility in the Age of the American Revolution.  Edited by Susan E. Klepp and Karin Wulf. Ithaca, N.Y.: Cornell University Press. 2010. .
Not All Wives: Women of Colonial Philadelphia. Ithaca, N.Y.: Cornell University Press. 2000. .
Milcah Martha Moore's Book: A Commonplace Book from Revolutionary America. University Park, Pennsylvania: Pennsylvania State University Press. 1997. .

References 

1964 births
Living people
College of William & Mary faculty
21st-century American historians
American women historians
American University alumni
Johns Hopkins University alumni
Writers from Charlottesville, Virginia
21st-century American women writers
20th-century American women writers
20th-century American historians
Women's historians
Historians from Virginia